The National Society of Film Critics Award for Best Actor is an annual award given by the National Society of Film Critics to honor the best leading actor of the year.

Winners

 † = Winner of the Academy Award for Best Actor
 ‡ = Nominated for the Academy Award for Best Actor
 ¥ = Winner of the Academy Award for Best Supporting Actor
 § = Nominated for the Academy Award for Best Supporting Actor

1960s

1970s

1980s

1990s

2000s

2010s

2020s

Multiple winners
3 wins
 Daniel Day-Lewis (1989, 2007, 2012)
 Jack Nicholson (1974, 1975, 1985)

2 wins
 Dustin Hoffman (1979, 1982)
 Steve Martin (1984, 1987)

See also
 National Board of Review Award for Best Actor
 New York Film Critics Circle Award for Best Actor
 Los Angeles Film Critics Association Award for Best Actor

References

National Society of Film Critics Awards
Film awards for lead actor